Trebejov is a village and municipality in Košice-okolie District in the Kosice Region of eastern Slovakia. In historical records, the village was first mentioned in 1289. The village lies at an altitude of 240 m, and covers an area of 7.671 km².
It has a population of about 165 people.  In 2019 the estimated figure for the end of the year was 205, composed almost entirely of ethnic Slovaks. There is a public library and a general store. There is a small railway station in the village. The nearest large railway station is at Kysak.

References

External links
http://www.statistics.sk/mosmis/eng/run.html

Villages and municipalities in Košice-okolie District
Šariš